Deh Khodadad (also Romanized as Deh Khodādād and Deh-e Khodā Dād; also known as Khel Khawāh and Khel Khvāh) is a village in Agahan Rural District, Kolyai District, Sonqor County, Kermanshah Province, Iran. At the 2006 census, its population was 257, in 53 families.

References 

Populated places in Sonqor County